Darko Ljubojević (born 8 January 1975) is a Bosnian retired professional footballer and current football official.

Club career
Ljubojević was born in Banja Luka. He formerly played, among others, for Red Star Belgrade in Serbia, CD Ourense and Cádiz CF in Spain, Borac Banja Luka and Laktaši in Bosnia and Herzegovina, Zalaegerszegi TE in Hungary and Panserraikos in Greece.

International career
Despite being s Serb from Bosnia and Herzegovina, Ljubojević represented FR Yugoslavia (Serbia and Montenegro) at U-21 level.

Post-playing career
After retiring, Ljubojević became sports director of Borac Banja Luka, a post he held until 26 February 2013, when he resigned. In 19 April 2011, he became the vice-president of the Football Association of Bosnia and Herzegovina. Currently, Ljubojević is serving as board executive of the Bosnia and Herzegovina FA.

References

External links

Interview at Borac B.Luka official website 

1975 births
Living people
Sportspeople from Banja Luka
Serbs of Bosnia and Herzegovina
Association football midfielders
Serbia and Montenegro footballers
Serbia and Montenegro under-21 international footballers
Bosnia and Herzegovina footballers
FK Borac Banja Luka players
FK Budućnost Valjevo players
Red Star Belgrade footballers
CD Ourense footballers
Cádiz CF players
Zalaegerszegi TE players
Panserraikos F.C. players
FK Laktaši players
First League of Serbia and Montenegro players
Segunda División players
Nemzeti Bajnokság I players
Football League (Greece) players
Bosnia and Herzegovina expatriate footballers
Expatriate footballers in Spain
Bosnia and Herzegovina expatriate sportspeople in Spain
Expatriate footballers in Hungary
Bosnia and Herzegovina expatriate sportspeople in Hungary
Expatriate footballers in Greece
Bosnia and Herzegovina expatriate sportspeople in Greece